Infinity 16 (stylized as INFINITY16) is a Japanese reggae sound system. They debuted as a major label artist in 2008. The project's most successful songs include "Dream Lover" (a collaboration with Shōnan no Kaze, Minmi and Moomin) and "Tsutaetai Koto ga Konna Aru noni" (with Wakadanna from Shōnan no Kaze and Jay'ed).

Biography 
In 1994, Tela-C started the project, with member Decem joining in the following year. The members stayed overseas in places such as New York City and Jamaica in 1998, and in 2002 started focusing on music properly. The group played at many clubs throughout Japan, and in 2004 won Club Citta's Sound Clash Tournament in Kawasaki.

Between 2005 and 2007, the group released six albums independently. In March 2007, the group won at the World Reggae Soundclash in Brooklyn, New York (in the International Cup‐Garrison Showdown category).

In 2007, Infinity 16 debuted under the major label Far Eastern Tribe Records, with the single "Dream Land" (with Shōnan no Kaze, Minmi and Moomin). At the same time, member Decem left the project.

Discography

Albums

Singles

†Japan Hot 100 established February 2008, RIAJ Digital Track Chart established April 2009.* charted on RIAJ Chaku-uta chart.

References

External links 
Official site 
Official blog 

Japanese pop music groups

Universal Music Japan artists
Musical groups from Kanagawa Prefecture
Japanese reggae musical groups